

Buildings and structures

Buildings

 1402 – Seville Cathedral is begun.
 1402 – Charles Bridge in Prague, Czech Republic is completed.
 1403
 The Gur-e-Amir Mausoleum in Samarkand is begun on the orders of Timur.
 The City God Temple of Shanghai is built.
 1405
 The Changdeokgung of Korea is completed.
 Construction of new Mausoleum of Khoja Ahmed Yasawi in Turkistan (Timurid Empire) ceases.
 1407 – Swalcliffe Tithe Barn in Oxfordshire, England, is completed.
 1409
 The Upper Castle in Vilnius in Lithuania is completed.
 The Trakai Island Castle at Trakai in Lithuania is completed.

Births
 c. 1400 – Filarete, born Antonio di Pietro Averlino, Florentine architect (died c. 1469)
 1404: February 14 – Leon Battista Alberti, Italian architect and polymath (died 1472)

Deaths
 1400: August 21 – Henry Yevele, English master mason (born c. 1320)

References

Architecture